Paola M. Goyco Ortiz (born 26 June 1995) is a Puerto Rican footballer who plays as a fullback for the Puerto Rico women's national team.

Early life
Goyco was raised in Mayagüez.

International career
Goyco capped for Puerto Rico at senior level during the 2018 CONCACAF Women's Championship qualification.

References

1995 births
Living people
Women's association football fullbacks
Puerto Rican women's footballers
People from Mayagüez, Puerto Rico
Puerto Rico women's international footballers
Women's Premier Soccer League players